Duke of Manchester is a title in the Peerage of Great Britain, and the current senior title of the House of Montagu. It was created in 1719 for the politician Charles Montagu, 4th Earl of Manchester. Manchester Parish in Jamaica was named after the 5th Duke, while its capital Mandeville was named after his son and heir. The current Duke is Alexander Montagu, 13th Duke of Manchester, a controversial British and Australian citizen who lives in the United States and who has served several prison sentences, who succeeded to the peerage in 2002 following the death of his father Angus Montagu, 12th Duke of Manchester, the last of the dukes to hold a seat in the House of Lords.

History 
Their ancestor was Richard Ladde, grandfather of the Lord Chief Justice Sir Edward, who changed his name to Montagu around 1447. His descendants claimed a connection with the older house of Montagu or Montacute, Barons Montagu or Montacute and Earls of Salisbury, but there is no sound evidence that the two families were related. A case has been made out for the possibility that the Ladde alias came from a division among coheirs about 1420 of the remaining small inheritance of a line of Montagus at Spratton and Little Creton, also in Northamptonshire.

The judge Sir Edward Montagu's grandson, Edward Montagu, was raised to the peerage as 1st Baron Montagu of Boughton. He is the ancestor of the Dukes of Montagu.  His brother, Sir Henry Montagu (c. 1563–1642), who served as Lord Chief Justice as well as Lord High Treasurer and Lord Privy Seal, was in 1620 raised to the Peerage of England as Viscount Mandeville, with the additional title Baron Montagu of Kimbolton, of Kimbolton in the County of Huntingdon. In 1626, he was made Earl of Manchester, of Manchester in the County of Lancaster. It is sometimes said, erroneously, that the title refers to Godmanchester in Huntingdonshire, and that the word "God" was deliberately excluded from the title on the basis that the grantee thought it would be blasphemous for him to be known as "Lord Godmanchester". However, the form of the creation makes it clear that the title refers to what is now the city of Manchester (at the time a town in Lancashire, formally known as the County of Lancaster).

His son, the 2nd Earl, was a prominent Parliamentary General during the Civil War, but later supported the restoration of Charles II. His son, the 3rd Earl, represented Huntingdonshire in the House of Commons. His son was the 4th Earl, who in 1719 was created Duke of Manchester.

Charles, 1st Duke of Manchester, was succeeded by his eldest son. The 2nd Duke notably served as Captain of the Yeomen of the Guard in the administration of Sir Robert Walpole. He was childless, and on his death, the titles passed to his younger brother, the 3rd Duke. He had earlier represented Huntingdonshire in Parliament. He was succeeded by his son, the 4th Duke. He was Ambassador to France and served as Lord Chamberlain of the Household. His son, the 5th Duke, was Governor of Jamaica between 1827 and 1830 also held office as Postmaster General. He was succeeded by his son, the 6th Duke. He represented Huntingdon in the House of Commons as a Tory.

His eldest son, the 7th Duke, was Conservative Member of Parliament for Bewdley and Huntingdonshire. His son, the 8th Duke, briefly represented Huntingdonshire in Parliament. He was succeeded by his eldest son, the 9th Duke. He sat on the Liberal benches in the House of Lords and served as Captain of the Yeomen of the Guard in the Liberal administration of Sir Henry Campbell-Bannerman. In the twentieth century, mismanagement and profligacy resulted in the wholesale depletion of the Dukedom's estates. Generational instability caused further damage to the family's honour: the 11th, 12th and 13th Dukes all had a criminal record.

Angus Montagu, 12th Duke of Manchester was the last of the dukes to serve in the House of Lords, until the adoption of the House of Lords Act 1999.
 
Alexander Montagu, the oldest son of the 12th Duke, succeeded his father as the 13th Duke in July 2002; a British and Australian citizen who lives in the United States, he had been known by the courtesy title of the heir apparent, Viscount Mandeville, since his father's succession to the peerage in 1985. He has not taken the required action to be included on the Roll of the Peerage, which was created two years after his succession in 2004; while this doesn't change his status as a duke itself, which is legally established by the letters patent, inclusion in the roll is since 2004 a requirement to have his title included in his passport. Under the provisions of the 2004 royal warrant he may register with the roll at any time.

Seats 

The principal estate of the Dukes of Manchester was Kimbolton Castle. A remaining  of the estate were sold by his eldest son and heir in 1975. The other family seat was Tandragee Castle, in County Armagh, Northern Ireland. It was sold in 1955, and the remaining estate in 1975, and is now the headquarters of Tayto (NI) Ltd.

Arms 

The arms of the Duke of Manchester have the following blazon: Quarterly, 1st & 4th: Argent, 3 fusils conjoined in fess gules (Montagu); 2nd & 3rd: Or an eagle displayed vert beaked and membered gules (Monthermer). The fusils or diamond shapes in the Montagu arms were originally intended to represent a range of mountains, as the name comes from the old French mont agu meaning "pointed hill". The arms represent a claim to be a cadet of the medieval Montagu (Montacute) family, earls of Salisbury, for which there is no proof (see above origins).

Titles 
The Duke of Manchester holds the subsidiary titles Earl of Manchester, Viscount Mandeville, and Baron Montagu of Kimbolton.

The heir apparent to the Dukedom takes the courtesy title Viscount Mandeville, and the heir apparent's eldest son is styled Lord Kimbolton.

Burial place
Many members of the Montagu family (Earls and Dukes of Manchester and their family members) are buried at St Andrew's Church, Kimbolton, Cambridgeshire (historically in Huntingdonshire). Several Montagu monuments still exist in the South Chapel, while the Montagu Vault (extended in 1853) is located beneath the North Chapel. The Montagu Vault is accessed from the churchyard via a doorway surmounted by heraldic beasts, which was added to the building in 1893. The 12th Duke of Manchester, who died in 2002, was cremated at Bedford Crematorium after which his ashes were placed in the Montagu Vault.

Viscount Mandeville (1620)

Earls of Manchester (1626)

Dukes of Manchester (1719) 

The heir presumptive to the dukedom is the present Duke's younger brother, Lord Kimble William Drogo Montagu (born 1964), whose heir is his only son William Anthony Drogo Montagu (born 2000)

Family tree

References

Further reading

 Kidd, Charles, and Williamson, David (editors): Debrett's Peerage and Baronetage 1990 edition. New York, St Martin's Press, 1990, 
 

Dukedoms in the Peerage of Great Britain
Noble titles created in 1719